"She's So Cold" is a song recorded by the Rolling Stones, released in September 1980 on the Emotional Rescue album.  It was also issued as  the second single from the album, with "Send It to Me" as the B-side.  Due to the song's lyric "she's so goddamned cold", the promotional copy sent to radio stations had a "cleaned up version" on one side, with the "God damn version" on the other.

Reception
Billboard called it a "torchy rock attack."  Record World said that "Keith [Richards] and Mick [Jagger] have typical woman problems here, but they're hot as ever."

Charts
The single peaked at number 33 in the UK Singles Chart and number 26 on the US Billboard Hot 100 chart in November 1980.   Along with the tracks, "Dance" and "Emotional Rescue", "She's So Cold" went to number nine on the Disco Top 100 chart.

References

The Rolling Stones songs
1980 singles
Songs written by Jagger–Richards
Song recordings produced by Jagger–Richards
British new wave songs
1980 songs